Dance All Night may refer to:

Albums
 Dance All Night (album), by XL, 2012
 Dance All Night, by Chubby Carrier, 1993

Songs
 "Dance All Night" (DeBarge song), 1987
 "Dance All Night" (Jessica Wright song), 2012
 "Dance All Night" (Poison Clan song), 1990
 "Dance All Night", by Autograph from Loud and Clear, 1987
 "Dance All Night", by Emma, 1991
 "Dance All Night", by The Tartans